The Forbidden Room is a 2015 Canadian experimental fantasy drama film co-directed by Guy Maddin and Evan Johnson, and written by Maddin, Johnson, and Robert Kotyk. The film stars Roy Dupuis, Clara Furey, Louis Negin, Jacques Nolot, Charlotte Rampling, Udo Kier, Gregory Hlady, Sparks, Karine Vanasse, Adele Haenel, Mathieu Amalric, Maria de Medeiros and Geraldine Chaplin.

Plot
The film's frame story, and the narrative it returns to the most, concerns a submarine crew transporting a volatile substance that will explode if they ever resurface. As the crew struggle to survive with low oxygen levels, a woodsman (Roy Dupuis) mysteriously forces his way onto the vessel; the crew believe his sudden appearance may lead to an escape from their predicament. The men navigate a labyrinth of rooms and passageways while trying to access the captain's chamber. Along the way, they recount stories that lead to other stories, which unfold in a complex and layered manner. The most important of these "sub-stories" shows the woodsman and his fellow "sapling-jacks" trying to rescue a woman named Margot from depraved kidnappers. Other sub-stories involve: a surgeon kidnapped by a team of "women skeletons" who work as insurance defrauders; a madman on a train under the charge of a womanizing psychiatrist; a mustache that seeks to comfort the widow of the man whose face it used to adorn; and a doctor cursed by a bust of Janus. The submarine crew finally reach the captain's "forbidden room", only to find him incapacitated. Most of the men die of asphyxiation, but the woodsman finds that the volatile cargo has transformed into his love, Margot. A passionate kiss leads into a montage of proposed endings from "The Book of Climaxes", and an abrupt, inconclusive ending to the film itself.

Cast

 Roy Dupuis as Cesare
 Clara Furey as Margot
 Louis Negin as Marv / Smithy / Mars / Organizer / Mr. Lanyon
 Udo Kier as Count Yugh / The Butler / The Dead Father / Guard / Pharmacist
 Karine Vanasse as Florence Labadie
 Gregory Hlady as Jarvis / Dr. Deane / A Husband
 Mathieu Amalric as Thadeusz M / Ostler
 Noel Burton as Wolf / Pilot / The Captain
 Geraldine Chaplin as The Master Passion / Nursemaid / Aunt Chance
 Paul Ahmarani as Dr. Deng / Speedy
 Caroline Dhavernas as Gong
 Jacques Nolot as Bent / Minister of the Interior
 Maria de Medeiros as The Blind Mother / Clotilde
 Charlotte Rampling as The Ostler's Mother
 Victor Andrés Trelles Turgeon as Pancho
 Sparks as the Voices of the Faceless Crooner
 Russell Mael provides the primary voice, Ron Mael provides additional voices.
 Sophie Desmarais as Jane Lanyon
 Ariane Labed as Alicia Warlock / The Chambermaid
 Slimane Dazi as Baron Pappenheim
 André Wilms as Surgeon
 Adèle Haenel as The Mute Invalid
 Céline Bonnier as Eve
 Lewis Furey as The Skull-Faced Man
 Amira Casar as Mrs. M
 Jean-François Stévenin as The Doctor
 Kim Morgan as Kim
 Marie Brassard as Mysterious Necklace Woman
 John Churchill as Karl Le Barron
 Arthur Holden as Auctioneer
 Anthony Lemke as Bud
 Elina Löwensohn as Sister
 Darcy Fehr as Nightclub Attendee / Climax Player

Production

Writing
Many of the stories within the film's nesting doll structure were inspired by a lost film and then reimagined in an absurdist way, sometimes based only on the title. When asked how the idea for the structure came about, Johnson said he is a fan of Raymond Roussel.

Filming and editing
The film was shot on digital in public studios (where the public could visit and attend the film shoots) at the Centre Georges Pompidou in Paris, France and the Centre PHI in Montreal, Quebec, Canada.

There was so much material that did not make the final cut that the directors decided to turn it into a web series, called Seances, which Maddin calls a "companion piece" to the film. The final cut of the film is slightly shorter than it was on its world premiere at the Sundance Festival; the directors had to do some re-editing anyway, because the soundtracks on the DCP "were out of synch with each other." Maddin said: "It was a nightmare. I felt the movie didn't get its premiere there. We went back and tightened it up because it was too long even for me, and now it's the right length."

Release
The Forbidden Room premiered at the 2015 Sundance Film Festival on 26 January 2015. It also screened at the 2015 Toronto International Film Festival on 16 September 2015.

The film was theatrically released in the United States on 7 October 2015 and in Canada two days later on 9 October and was released in the United Kingdom on 11 December 2015.

Critical reception
The film received critical acclaim. On Rotten Tomatoes, the film has a 96% rating based on 67 reviews, with an average rating of 8.16/10. The site's consensus states: "The Forbidden Room may frustrate viewers looking for a linear experience, but those seeking a challenge – or already familiar with director Guy Maddin's work – will be rewarded." Metacritic reports an 81 out of 100 rating, based on 14 critics, indicating "universal acclaim".

In December, the film was announced as part of TIFF's annual Canada's Top Ten screening series of the ten best Canadian films of the year.

Accolades
The film won the Rogers Best Canadian Film Award (C$100,000, awarded by the Toronto Film Critics Association.

Galen Johnson received a Canadian Screen Award nomination for Best Art Direction/Production Design at the 4th Canadian Screen Awards in 2016.

See also
 The Seances project.
 Lost films

References

External links
 
 
 
 
 
 The Forbidden Room: The Ghost of a Dead Movie - Brows Held High

2015 films
2010s English-language films
2010s mystery comedy-drama films
2015 romantic comedy-drama films
Canadian mystery comedy-drama films
Canadian romantic comedy-drama films
English-language Canadian films
Films directed by Guy Maddin
Films shot in Montreal
Films shot in Paris
National Film Board of Canada films
Films produced by David Christensen
2015 comedy films
2015 drama films
2010s Canadian films